Opeia is a genus of slant-faced grasshoppers in the family Acrididae. There are at least two described species in Opeia.

Species
These two species belong to the genus Opeia:
 Opeia atascosa Hebard, 1937 (atascosa grasshopper)
 Opeia obscura (Thomas, 1872) (obscure grasshopper)

References

Further reading

External links

 

Acrididae genera
Articles created by Qbugbot
Gomphocerinae